Freimann or Freiman may refer to:

Freimann 
 Freimann (Munich U-Bahn), an underground railway station in Munich, Germany
 Israel Meir Freimann (1830–1884), Polish-born German rabbi
 Studentenstadt Freimann, a student housing complex in Munich, Germany
 Schwabing-Freimann, a city borough in the borough of Schwabing, Munich, Germany

Freiman 
 Freiman Mall, Ottawa, Canada
 Freimans, a defunct department store in Ottawa, Canada
 Alexander Freiman (1879–1968), Polish/Soviet linguist
 Archibald Jacob Freiman (1880–1944), Canadian Zionist
 Gregory Freiman (born 1926), Israeli mathematician
 Nate Freiman (born 1986), American baseball player
 Freiman's theorem, a combinatorial result in number theory proved by Gregory Freiman

See also 
 Foellinger-Freimann Botanical Conservatory, Fort Wayne, Indiana, U.S.
 Frey (disambiguation)
 Freeman (disambiguation)